Canlubang Golf & Country Club (popularly known as Can Golf) is a golf course in Luzon, situated 5 kilometers (3.1 mi) from Terelay at the foot of Barangay Casile, Cabuyao, and Laguna. Its' similar country clubs are The Country Club in Santa Rosa and Santa Elena Golf Course. It is considered one course in Luzon. It was formerly a sugar cane plantation during the José Yulo period. It has two northern courses and southern courses with 36 holes in total.

See also 
 Canlubang Sugar Barons
 Matang Tubig

References 

Golf clubs and courses in the Philippines
Canlubang
Buildings and structures in Calamba, Laguna
Tourist attractions in Laguna (province)